Team Miles is a 6U CubeSat that will demonstrate navigation in deep space using innovative plasma thrusters. It will also test a software-defined radio operating in the S-band for communications from about 4 million kilometers from Earth. Team Miles is one of ten CubeSats launched with the Artemis 1 mission into a heliocentric orbit in cislunar space on the maiden flight of the Space Launch System (SLS), that took place on 16 November 2022.

Overview 

The spacecraft, a 6-Unit CubeSat — measuring 10 cm × 20 cm × 30 cm — was designed and is being developed by a non-profit group of fifteen citizen scientists and engineers (Fluid and Reason, LLC) based at Tampa, Florida. Since the Team Miles won the first place at CubeQuest Challenge for the selection process, Fluid and Reason, LLC stroke partnerships and became Miles Space, a commercial endeavor to further develop the technology and intellectual property that has come out of the design process.

Propulsion 
Wesley Faler, who leads Fluid and Reason, LLC., is the inventor of the ion thruster to be used, which he calls ConstantQ Model H. It is a form of electric propulsion for spacecraft. The engine is a hybrid plasma and laser thruster that uses ionized iodine as propellant. The Model H system includes 4 thruster heads which are canted, allowing for both primary propulsion and attitude control (orientation) without the use of moving parts. The goal within the CubeQest Challenge is to travel 4 million kilometers, but the team will attempt to go as far as 96 million kilometers before the end of the mission.

Radio 
The spacecraft will use the USRP B200mini, a software-defined radio operating in the S band for communications from about 4 million kilometers from Earth.

See also 

The 10 CubeSats flying in the Artemis 1 mission
 Near-Earth Asteroid Scout by NASA was a solar sail spacecraft that was planned to encounter a near-Earth asteroid (mission failure)
 BioSentinel is an astrobiology mission
 LunIR by Lockheed Martin Space
 Lunar IceCube, by the Morehead State University
 CubeSat for Solar Particles (CuSP)
 Lunar Polar Hydrogen Mapper (LunaH-Map), designed by the Arizona State University
 EQUULEUS, submitted by JAXA and the University of Tokyo
 OMOTENASHI, submitted by JAXA, was a lunar lander (mission failure)
 ArgoMoon, designed by Argotec and coordinated by Italian Space Agency (ASI)
 Team Miles, by Fluid and Reason LLC, Tampa, Florida

The 3 CubeSat missions removed from Artemis 1
 Lunar Flashlight will map exposed water ice on the Moon
 Cislunar Explorers, Cornell University, Ithaca, New York
 Earth Escape Explorer (CU-E3), University of Colorado Boulder

References 

CubeSats
Missions to the Moon
Space probes
Spacecraft launched in 2022
2022 in the United States
Secondary payloads